Hans Scherfig (April 8, 1905 – January 28, 1979) was a renowned Danish writer and artist.

His most famous works of literature include Stolen Spring, Frydenholm, Idealists, and The Scorpion, the last of which was published in over 20 countries. He is also well known for his distinctive Naivist lithographs which depict jungle and savanna scenes that owe something to  Henri Rousseau, and various drawings and paintings with satirical, political, and biblical subject matter.

Central to Scherfig's work was his lifelong political engagement. Already in his early years he became a dedicated communist and remained so until his death in 1979. He was also a long-standing member of the Communist Party of Denmark. Because of this Scherfig was imprisoned by the Nazi German military occupation forces in Denmark during WWII. During the Cold War, Scherfig intensified his critical attitude against the United States.

Scherfig lies in an unmarked grave in Assistens Cemetery (Copenhagen). His grave can be identified by the stone sculpture of a turtle which lies beside it

Work

Novels
Den Døde Mand, 1937
Den forsvundne fuldmægtig, 1938
Det Forsømte Forår (Stolen Spring), 1940
Idealister (Idealists), 1945
Skorpionen (The Scorpion), 1953
Frydenholm, 1962
Den Fortabte abe, 1964

Prizes 
Scherfig won a number of prizes within the field of Danish literature, including the following:
 1973 Grand Prize of the Danish Academy
 1965 Jeanne and Henri Nathan's Memorial Grant
 1963 Adam Oehlenschläger legatet
 1954 Holger Drachmann Scholarship
 1952 Jeanne and Henri Nathan's Memorial Grant

References

1905 births
1979 deaths
Danish artists
Danish male writers
Danish communists
Recipients of the Grand Prize of the Danish Academy